Lodochnyy Island is a peninsula, and former island in Vyborgsky District, Leningrad Oblast, Russia. It lies within Vyborg Bay, which is located near the eastern end of Gulf of Finland in the Baltic Sea.

It is the site of the Villa Sellgren, which according to Russian opposition leader Alexei Navalny, is owned by Vladimir Putin through friends.

References 

Peninsulas of Russia